Fricis Dambrēvics (1906 – ?) was a Latvian football forward, a three-time champion of Latvia.

Biography

His entire top level career Dambrēvics played with the strongest Liepāja football club of 1920s and 1930s – Olimpija Liepāja for which he was one of the leading goalscorers. Dambrēvics won three Latvian league titles (1927–1929) and became a three-time winner of the Riga Football Cup playing for Olimpija. From 1926 to 1928 Dambrēvics played 8 international matches for Latvia national football team scoring two goals. After retiring from playing Dambrēvics coached young footballers in Liepāja, he was the first coach of Harijs Feldmanis.

References

Latvian footballers
Latvia international footballers
1906 births
Sportspeople from Liepāja
Year of death missing
Association football forwards